Tilgner is a surname. Notable people with the surname include

People
 Jonna Tilgner (born 1984), German athlete (de)
 Ulrich Tilgner (born 1948), German journalist (de)
 Viktor Oskar Tilgner (1844 –1896), Austrian sculptor

Other uses
 21650 Tilgner

German-language surnames